Stogovci is a settlement in the Municipality of Apače in northeastern Slovenia, close to the border with Austria.

The village chapel with a small belfry lies in the southern part of the village. It was built in the early 20th century.

References

External links 
Stogovci on Geopedia

Populated places in the Municipality of Apače